Zhou Jingjing is a Chinese wheelchair fencer. She represented China at the Summer Paralympics in 2012, 2016 & 2021 and in total she won four gold medals and two silver medals.

References

External links 
 

Living people
Year of birth missing (living people)
Place of birth missing (living people)
Chinese female fencers
Wheelchair fencers at the 2012 Summer Paralympics
Wheelchair fencers at the 2016 Summer Paralympics
Medalists at the 2016 Summer Paralympics
Paralympic gold medalists for China
Paralympic bronze medalists for China
Paralympic medalists in wheelchair fencing
Paralympic wheelchair fencers of China
21st-century Chinese women